Edward Hill (born 26 March 1999) is an English professional rugby union player who plays as a Flanker for Bath.

Rugby career

Club
Hill started playing rugby as a child at Malvern RFC prior to joining the Worcester Warriors academy. In November 2017 he made his club debut against Sale Sharks in the Anglo-Welsh Cup. He made his league debut at the start of the 2018–19 Premiership season coming off the bench to score two tries including the winner against Leicester Tigers at Welford Road. On 3 November 2018, an article on BBC Sport's website, illustrated the meteoric rise of Hill, mentioning "(Hill's) four tries in his last five appearances for Worcester".

In June 2020 Hill signed a contract extension which would see him remain at Worcester until 2024 and the following month he was confirmed as club captain.

In October 2022, Hill had his contracted terminated by the club, alongside the rest of his teammates after WRFC Players Limited, the company that owns Worcester Warriors RFC, were liquidated following a winding up petition. When speaking on the matter, Hill was quoted as saying, "There will be nothing written for the people who put us in this situation but to the governing bodies of rugby, something needs to change so that this doesn’t happen to any club again."

After joining Bath on loan only days before his Worcester contract was terminated it was later announced he had joined the club on a permanent basis.

International
Hill represented England under-16 and in March 2017 scored a try for the England under-18 side against France. He made his debut for the England under-20 team against Italy during the 2017 Six Nations Under 20s Championship and the following year started in the final of the 2018 World Rugby Under 20 Championship as England finished runners up to hosts France. He was also a member of the squad that finished fifth at the 2019 World Rugby Under 20 Championship and during the tournament scored two tries in a pool game against Australia.

In October 2018 Hill received his first call-up by coach Eddie Jones to the senior squad for a training camp prior to the autumn internationals. On 17 November 2018 he made his Test debut as a 75th minute substitute in the victory over Japan.

References

External links
itsrugby.co.uk Profile

1999 births
Living people
England international rugby union players
English rugby union players
Rugby union flankers
Rugby union players from Worcester
Worcester Warriors players
Bath Rugby players